First Congregational Church is located in Hartland, Wisconsin. The church was built in the Gothic Revival architecture style in 1923. It was added to the National Register of Historic Places on December 8, 1986, for its architectural significance.

The congregation was founded by 1842, meeting in Henry Cheney's barn.  It built a church in 1847.  The present church was built in 1923.

It was deemed to be one of two "fine local examples of the Gothic Revival style" in Hartland, with the Zion Evangelical Lutheran Church, also NRHP-listed as part of the same study.  The Dansk Evangelical Lutheran Kirke was deemed to be a more unusual example of the style.

References

Churches on the National Register of Historic Places in Wisconsin
Churches in Waukesha County, Wisconsin
Congregational churches in Wisconsin
Gothic Revival church buildings in Wisconsin
Churches completed in 1923
National Register of Historic Places in Waukesha County, Wisconsin